Pietro Alberini (1625 – 9 July 1679) was a Roman Catholic prelate who served as Titular Archbishop of Nicomedia (1674–1679) and Apostolic Nuncio to Savoy (1674–1675).

Biography
Pietro Alberini was born in Rome, Italy in 1625.
On 15 January 1674, he was appointed during the papacy of Pope Clement X as Titular Archbishop of Nicomedia. 
On 4 March 1674, he was consecrated bishop by Francesco Nerli (iuniore), Archbishop of Florence with Francesco Boccapaduli, Bishop Emeritus of Città di Castello, and Giuseppe Eusanio, Titular Bishop of Porphyreon serving as co-consecrators. 
On 4 March 1674, he was appointed during the papacy of Pope Clement X as Apostolic Nuncio to Savoy where he served until his resignation in Nov 1675. 
He served as Titular Archbishop of Nicomedia until his death on 9 July 1679.

See also 
Catholic Church in Italy

References

External links and additional sources
 (for Chronology of Bishops) 
 (for Chronology of Bishops) 
 (for Chronology of Bishops) 

17th-century Roman Catholic titular bishops
Bishops appointed by Pope Clement X
1625 births
1679 deaths
Apostolic Nuncios to Savoy